Enid Georgiana Stamp Taylor (12 June 1904 – 13 January 1946) was an English actress. Her childhood home was 17, Percy Avenue, in Whitley Bay, Northumberland, in what is now Tyne and Wear.

Taylor first became known when she won a beauty pageant at a young age and this led to parts in musical comedies on stage, including The Cabaret Girl (1922), in which she was billed as simply "Enid Taylor". She progressed to film, appearing in Alfred Hitchcock's Easy Virtue (1928), Queen of Hearts (1934), and The Wicked Lady (1945).

The Stamp part of her name was included as a middle name; it was her  grandmother's maiden name. Taylor married Sidney Colton and they had a daughter called Robin Anne who was born in 1933. Her marriage to Colton was dissolved in 1936. On 9 January 1946 she fell in the bathroom of her Park Lane flat and suffered a fractured skull. She was unconscious for three days; she woke briefly following two operations at St George's Hospital in Wimbledon to remove a blood clot to her brain, but died on the 13 January, two months after the release of her penultimate film, The Wicked Lady.

Partial filmography

 Land of Hope and Glory (1927) - Jane
 Easy Virtue (1928) - Sarah
 A Little Bit of Fluff (1928) - Susie West
 Yellow Stockings (1928) - Nellie Jackson
 Cocktails (1928) - Betty
 The Broken Melody (1929) - Gloria
 Meet My Sister (1933) - Lulu Marsoc
 A Political Party (1934) - Elvira Whitman
 Gay Love (1934) - Marie Hopkins
 Virginia's Husband (1934) - June Haslett
 The Feathered Serpent (1934) - Ella Crewe
 Radio Pirates (1935) (also known as 'Big Ben Calling') - Enid
 So You Won't Talk (1935) - Pauline
 Mr. What's-His-Name? (1935) - Corinne Henfield
 Jimmy Boy (1935) - The Star
 While Parents Sleep (1935) - Lady Cattering
 Two Hearts in Harmony (1935) - Sheila
 Queen of Hearts (1936) - Yvonne
 Blind Man's Bluff (1936) - Sylvia Fairfax 
 House Broken (1936) - Cousin Carrie
 Keep Your Seats, Please (1936) - Madame Louise
 Take a Chance (1937) - Cicely Burton
 Action for Slander (1937) - Jenny
 Underneath the Arches (1937) - Dolores
 Feather Your Nest (1937) - Daphne Randall
 O-Kay for Sound (1937) - Jill Smith - Secretary
 Talking Feet (1937) - Sylvia Shirley
 Stepping Toes (1938) - Mrs. Warrington
 Climbing High (1938) - Winnie
 Old Iron (1938) - Eileen Penshaw
 Blondes for Danger (1938) - Valerie
 The Lambeth Walk (1939) - Jacqueline
 The Girl Who Forgot (1940) - Caroline Tonbridge
 Spring Meeting (1941) - Tiny Fox-Collier
 The Farmer's Wife (1941) - Mary Hearne
 South American George (1941) - Frances Martinique
 Hatter's Castle (1942) - Nancy
 Alibi (1942) - Dany
 Candlelight in Algeria (1944) - Maritza
 The Wicked Lady (1945) - Lady Kingsclere
 Caravan (1946) - Bertha (final film role)

References

External links

1904 births
1946 deaths
English film actresses
English silent film actresses
Accidental deaths from falls
Accidental deaths in England
20th-century English actresses